"My Heart Is Yours" is a song by Didrik Solli-Tangen, Norwegian entry in the Eurovision Song Contest 2010.

My Heart Is Yours may also refer to:

"My Heart Is Yours" (Passion song), 2014 single by Passion Conferences
"My Heart Is Yours", 1970 single by Wilbert Harrison
My Heart Is Yours, 1990 album by Doyle Lawson
"My Heart Is Yours", 2010 single by Justin Nozuka
"My Heart Is Yours", song by American R&B singer Vesta Williams from Vesta (album)
"My Heart is Yours" (TV series), 2014 Mexican telenovela

See also
Yours Is My Heart Alone
My Heart Is Set on You